The qualification for the 2012 European Baseball Championship was held from July 25–30, 2011 in Belgium, Croatia and Spain, from July 26–29, 2011 in Israel and from July 27–29, 2011 in Russia. 22 nations contested to qualify for 5 spots available among the 7 already qualified teams from the 2010 competition. These are, Czech Republic, France, Germany, Greece, Italy, the Netherlands and Sweden.

Pool Antwerp

Standings

Schedule

Final

Pool Barcelona

Standings

Schedule

Final

Pool Krymsk

Standings
 withdrew.

Schedule

Pool Tel Aviv

Standings

Schedule

Final

Pool Zagreb

Standings

Schedule

Final

External links
Game Results Pool Antwerp
Game Results Pool Barcelona
Game Results Pool Krymsk
Game Results Pool Tel Aviv
Game Results Pool Zagreb

References

Qualifier for 2012 European Baseball Championship
European Baseball Championship – Qualification
International baseball competitions hosted by Belgium
International baseball competitions hosted by Spain
International sports competitions hosted by Croatia
2011 in Spanish sport
2011 in Croatian sport
2011 in Belgian sport
European Baseball Championship qualification